Mafinga Town Council is one of the five districts of the Iringa Region of Tanzania.

In 2016 the Tanzania National Bureau of Statistics report there were 74,963 people in the town, from 51,902 in 2012.

References 

Districts of Iringa Region